Das Kapital, also known as Capital: A Critique of Political Economy or sometimes simply Capital (1867–1883), is a foundational theoretical text in materialist philosophy, critique of political economy and politics by Karl Marx. Marx aimed to reveal the economic patterns underpinning the capitalist mode of production in contrast to classical political economists such as Adam Smith, Jean-Baptiste Say, David Ricardo and John Stuart Mill. While Marx did not live to publish the planned second, third and fourth parts, the second and third volumes were completed from his notes and published after his death by his colleague Friedrich Engels; the fourth volume was completed and published after Engels's death by Marxist philosoper Karl Kautsky. Das Kapital is the most cited book published before 1950 in the social sciences.

Themes 
In Das Kapital (1867), Marx proposes that the motivating force of capitalism is in the exploitation of labor, whose unpaid work is the ultimate source of surplus value. The owner of the means of production is able to claim the right to this surplus value because they are legally protected by the ruling regime through property rights and the legally established distribution of shares which are by law distributed only to company owners and their board members. The historical section shows how these rights were acquired in the first place chiefly through plunder and conquest and the activity of the merchant and "middle-man". In producing capital, the workers continually reproduce the economic conditions by which they labour. Das Kapital proposes an explanation of the "laws of motion" of the capitalist economic system from its origins to its future by describing the dynamics of the accumulation of capital, the growth of wage labour, the transformation of the workplace, the concentration of capital, commercial competition, the banking system, the decline of the profit rate, land-rents, et cetera. The critique of the political economy of capitalism proposes:
 Wage-labour is the basic "cell-form" (trade unit) of a capitalist society. Moreover, because commerce as a human activity implied no morality beyond that required to buy and sell goods and services, the growth of the market system made discrete entities of the economic, the moral, and the legal spheres of human activity in society; hence, subjective moral value is separate from objective economic value. Subsequently, political economy (the just distribution of wealth) and "political arithmetic" (about taxes) were reorganized into three discrete fields of human activity, namely economics, law and ethics—politics and economics were divorced.
 "The economic formation of society [is] a process of natural history". Thus, it is possible for a political economist to objectively study the scientific laws of capitalism, given that its expansion of the market system of commerce had objectified human economic relations. The use of money (cash nexus) voided religious and political illusions about its economic value and replaced them with commodity fetishism, the belief that an object (commodity) has inherent economic value. Because societal economic formation is a historical process, no one person could control or direct it, thereby creating a global complex of social connections among capitalists. The economic formation (individual commerce) of a society thus precedes the human administration of an economy (organised commerce).
 The structural contradictions of a capitalist economy (German: gegensätzliche Bewegung) describe the contradictory movement originating from the two-fold character of labour and so the class struggle between labour and capital, the wage labourer and the owner of the means of production. These capitalist economic contradictions operate "behind the backs" of the capitalists and the workers as a result of their activities and yet remain beyond their immediate perceptions as men and women and as social classes.
 The economic crises (recession, depression, et cetera) that are rooted in the contradictory character of the economic value of the commodity (cell-unit) of a capitalist society are the conditions that lead to proletarian revolution—which The Communist Manifesto (1848) collectively identified as a weapon forged by the capitalists which the working class "turned against the bourgeoisie itself".
 In a capitalist economy, technological improvement and its consequent increased production augment the amount of material wealth (use value) in society while simultaneously diminishing the economic value of the same wealth, thereby diminishing the rate of profit—a paradox characteristic of economic crisis in a capitalist economy. "Poverty in the midst of plenty" consequent to over-production and under-consumption.

After two decades of economic study and preparatory work (especially regarding the theory of surplus value), the first volume appeared in 1867 as The Production Process of Capital. After Marx's death in 1883, Engels introduced Volume II: The Circulation Process of Capital in 1885; and Volume III: The Overall Process of Capitalist Production in 1894 from manuscripts and the first volume. These three volumes are collectively known as Das Kapital.

Synopsis

Capital, Volume I 

Capital, Volume I (1867) is a critical analysis of political economy, meant to reveal the contradictions of the capitalist mode of production, how it was the precursor of the socialist mode of production and of the class struggle rooted in the capitalist social relations of production. The first of three volumes of Das Kapital was published on 14 September 1867, dedicated to Wilhelm Wolff and was the sole volume published in Marx's lifetime.

Capital, Volume II 
Capital, Volume II, subtitled The Process of Circulation of Capital, was prepared by Engels from notes left by Marx and published in 1885. It is divided into three parts:
 The Metamorphoses of Capital and Their Circuits
 The Turnover of Capital
 The Reproduction and Circulation of the Aggregate Social Capital.

In Volume II, the main ideas behind the marketplace are to be found, namely how value and surplus-value are realized. Its dramatis personae, not so much the worker and the industrialist (as in Volume I), but rather the money owner and money lender, the wholesale merchant, the trader and the entrepreneur or functioning capitalist. Moreover, workers appear in Volume II essentially as buyers of consumer goods and therefore as sellers of the commodity labour power, rather than producers of value and surplus-value, although this latter quality established in Volume I remains the solid foundation on which the whole of the unfolding analysis is based.

Marx wrote in a letter sent to Engels on 30 April 1868: "In Book 1 [...] we content ourselves with the assumption that if in the self-expansion process £100 becomes £110, the latter will find already in existence in the market the elements into which it will change once more. But now we investigate the conditions under which these elements are found at hand, namely the social intertwining of the different capitals, of the component parts of capital and of revenue (= s)". This intertwining, conceived as a movement of commodities and of money, enabled Marx to work out at least the essential elements, if not the definitive form of a coherent theory of the trade cycle, based upon the inevitability of periodic disequilibrium between supply and demand under the capitalist mode of production (Ernest Mandel, Intro to Volume II of Capital, 1978). Part 3 is the point of departure for the topic of capital accumulation which was given its Marxist treatment later in detail by Rosa Luxemburg, among others.

Capital, Volume III 
Capital, Volume III, subtitled The Process of Capitalist Production as a Whole, was prepared by Engels from notes left by Marx and published in 1894. It is divided into seven parts:
The conversion of Surplus Value into Profit and the rate of Surplus Value into the rate of Profit
Conversion of Profit into Average Profit
The Law of the Tendency of the Rate of Profit to Fall
Conversion of Commodity Capital and Money Capital into Commercial Capital and Money-Dealing Capital (Merchant's Capital)
Division of Profit Into Interest and Profit of Enterprise, Interest Bearing Capital.
Transformation of Surplus-Profit into Ground Rent.
Revenues and Their Sources

The work is best known today for Part 3 which in summary says that as the organic fixed capital requirements of production rise as a result of advancements in production generally, the rate of profit tends to fall. This result which orthodox Marxists believe is a principal contradictory characteristic leading to an inevitable collapse of the capitalist order was held by Marx and Engels to—as a result of various contradictions in the capitalist mode of production—result in crises whose resolution necessitates the emergence of an entirely new mode of production as the culmination of the same historical dialectic that led to the emergence of capitalism from prior forms.

Intellectual influences 
The purpose of Das Kapital (1867) was a scientific foundation for the politics of the modern labour movement. The analyses were meant "to bring a science, by criticism, to the point where it can be dialectically represented" and so "reveal the law of motion of modern society" to describe how the capitalist mode of production was the precursor of the socialist mode of production. The argument is a critique of the classical economics of Adam Smith, David Ricardo, John Stuart Mill and Benjamin Franklin, drawing on the dialectical method that G. W. F. Hegel developed in Science of Logic and The Phenomenology of Spirit. Other intellectual influences on Capital were the French socialists Charles Fourier, Henri de Saint-Simon, Jean Charles Léonard de Sismondi and Pierre-Joseph Proudhon.

At university, Marx wrote a dissertation comparing the philosophy of nature in the works of the philosophers Democritus (circa 460–370 BC) and Epicurus (341–270 BC). The logical architecture of Das Kapital is derived in part from the Politics and the Nicomachean Ethics by Aristotle, including the fundamental distinction between use value and exchange value, the syllogisms (C-M-C' and M-C-M') for simple commodity circulation and the circulation of value as capital. Moreover, the description of machinery under capitalist relations of production as "self-acting automata" derives from Aristotle's speculations about inanimate instruments capable of obeying commands as the condition for the abolition of slavery. In the 19th century, Marx's research of the available politico-economic literature required twelve years, usually in the British Library in London.

Capital, Volume IV

At the time of his death (1883), Marx had prepared the manuscript for Das Kapital, Volume IV, a critical history of theories of surplus value of his time, the 19th century, based on the earlier manuscript Theories of Surplus Value (1862–63). The philosopher Karl Kautsky (1854–1938) published a partial edition of Marx's surplus-value critique and later published a full, three-volume edition as Theorien über den Mehrwert (Theories of Surplus Value, 1905–1910). The first volume was published in English as A History of Economic Theories (1952).

Translations 
The first translated publication of Das Kapital was in the Russian Empire in March 1872. It was the first foreign publication and the English edition appeared in 1887. Despite Russian censorship proscribing "the harmful doctrines of socialism and communism", the Russian censors considered Das Kapital as a "strictly scientific work" of political economy, the content of which did not apply to monarchic Russia, where "capitalist exploitation" had never occurred and was officially dismissed, given "that very few people in Russia will read it, and even fewer will understand it". Nonetheless, Marx acknowledged that Russia was the country where Das Kapital "was read and valued more than anywhere". For instance, the Russian edition was the fastest selling as 3,000 copies were sold in one year while the German edition took five years to sell 1,000, therefore the Russian translation sold fifteen times faster than the German original.

The foreign editions of Capital. Critique of Political Economy (1867) by Karl Marx include a Russian translation by the revolutionary socialist Mikhail Bakunin (1814–1876). Marx revised, rewrote, and monitored a French translation, published in 44 installments from August 1872 through May 1875, and then as a single work with a printing of ten thousand copies, the largest up until then. Eventually, Marx's work was translated into all major languages. The English translation of volume 1 by Samuel Moore and Eleanor Marx's partner Edward Aveling, overseen by Engels, was published in 1887 as Capital: A Critical Analysis of Capitalist Production by Swan Sonnenschein, Lowrey, & Co. This was reissued in the 1970s by Progress Publishers in Moscow, while a more recent English translation was made by Ben Fowkes and David Fernbach (the Penguin edition). The definitive critical edition of Marx's works, known as MEGA II (Marx-Engels Gesamtausgabe)
, includes Das Kapital in German (only the first volume is in French) and shows all the versions and alterations made to the text as well as a very extensive apparatus of footnotes and cross-references.

The first unabridged translation of Das Kapital to Bengali was done by professor Piyush Dasgupta. It was published in six volumes by Baniprakash, Kolkata, India between 1974 and 1983.

In 2012, Red Quill Books released Capital: In Manga!, a comic book version of Volume I which is an expanded English translation of the successful 2008 Japanese pocket version Das Kapital known as Manga de Dokuha.

Reviews 
In 2017, the historian Gareth Stedman Jones wrote in the Books and Arts section of the scientific journal Nature: Positive reception also cited the soundness of the methodology used in producing the book, which is called immanent critique. This approach, which starts from simple category and gradually unfolds into complex categories, employed "internal" criticism that finds contradiction within and between categories while discovering aspects of reality that the categories cannot explain. This meant that Marx had to build his arguments on historical narratives and empirical evidence rather than the arbitrary application of his ideas in his evaluation of capitalism.

On the other hand, Das Kapital has also received criticism. There are theorists who claimed that this text was unable to reconcile capitalist exploitation with prices dependent upon subjective wants in exchange relations. Marxists generally reply that only socially necessary labor time, that is, labor which is spent on commodities for which there is market-demand, can be considered productive labour and therefore exploited on Marx's account. There are also those who argued that Marx's so-called immiseration thesis is presumed to mean that the proletariat is absolutely immiserated.  The existing scholarly consensus tends towards the opposite view that Marx believed that only relative immiseration would occur, that is, a fall in labor's share of output. Marx himself frequently polemicized against the view "that the amount of real wages ... is a fixed amount."

See also 

 Accumulation by dispossession
 Analytical Marxism
 Étienne Balibar
 Eduard Bernstein
 G. A. Cohen
 Capital accumulation
 Cost of capital
 Crisis theory
 Culture of capitalism
 History of theory of capitalism
 Immiseration thesis
 Imperialism, the Highest Stage of Capitalism
 Krisis Groupe
 Labor theory of value
 Law of accumulation
 Law of value
 Vladimir Lenin
 Marx's theory of alienation
 Primitive accumulation of capital
 Relations of production
 Return on capital
 Surplus labour
 Valorisation
 Value added

Footnotes

Further reading 

 Althusser, Louis; Balibar, Étienne (2009). Reading Capital. London: Verso.
 Althusser, Louis (October 1969). "How to Read Marx's Capital" . Marxism Today. pp. 302–305. Originally appeared in French in L'Humanité on 21 April 1969.
 Eugen Böhm von Bawerk (1896), Karl Marx and the Close of His System
 Bottomore, Thomas, ed. (1998). A Dictionary of Marxist Thought. Oxford: Blackwell.
 Euchner, Walter; Schmidt, Alfred, eds. (1968). Kritik der politischen Ökonomie heute. 100 Jahre "Kapital" . Frankfurt: Europäische Verlagsanstalt; Wien: Europa-Verlag. DNB 457299002.
 Fine, Ben (2010). Marx's Capital. 5th ed. London: Pluto.
 Harvey, David (2010). A Companion to Marx's Capital. London: Verso.
 Harvey, David (2006). The Limits of Capital. London: Verso.
 Lapides, Kenneth. "Marx's Wage Theory in Historical Perspective".
 Mandel, Ernest. Marxist Economic Theory. Vols. 1 and 2. New York: Monthly Review Press.
 Marx, Karl; McLellan, David, ed. (2008). Capital: An Abridged Edition. Oxford: Oxford Paperbacks. Abridged edition. .
 Heinrich, Michael (2004, translation 2012) "An Introduction to the Three Volumes of Karl Marx's Capital" translated by Alexander Locasio. Monthly Review Press. 
 Postone, Moishe (1993). Time, Labor, and Social Domination: A Reinterpretation of Marx's Critical Theory. Cambridge: Cambridge University Press.
 Morishima, Michio (1973). Marx's Economics, a dual theory of worth and growth. Cambridge university Press.
 Variety Artworks (2012). Capital: In Manga! . Ottawa: Red Quill Books. .
 Cleaver, Harry (1979) Reading Capital Politically. University of Texas Press 1st ed., AK Press 2nd edition. 
 Wheen, Francis (2006). Marx's Das Kapital—A Biography. New York: Atlantic Monthly Press. .
 Roberts, William Clare (2016). Marx's Inferno: The Political theory of Capital. Princeton University Press.

External links 

 Althusser, Louis (21 April 1969). "How to Read Marx's Capital".
 "Wage Labour and Capital". An earlier work by Marx that deals with many of the ideas later expanded in Das Kapital.
 Engels, Friedrich (1867) "Synopsis of Capital".
 Harvey, David. "Reading Marx's Capital". University open courses.
 Liberation School. (2021). "Reading Capital with Comrades" podcast class series
 Ehrbar, Hans G. "Annotations, Explanations and Clarifications to Capital". It helps with understanding the early concepts.
 Choonara, Joseph. "Capital". Socialist Worker. First in a series of accessible columns on Das Kapital.
 "PolyluxMarx—A Capital Workbook in Slides" (covers Volume I of Das Capital in PowerPoint slides) .
 Harvey, David (12 July 2018). "Why Marx's Capital Still Matters". Jacobin. Retrieved 24 April 2019.
 Segrillo, Angelo. Karl Marx's Capital (Vols. 1, 2, 3) Abridged. São Paulo: FFLCH/USP, 2020.

 Online editions
 Capital, Volume I (1867); published in Marx's lifetime:
 Capital Volume I: The Process of Production of Capital from the Marxists Internet Archive.
 .
  Capital, Volume I 1974 Progress Publishers edition, downloadable PDF from the Internet Archive.
 Capital, Volume II (1885); manuscript not completed by Marx before his death in 1883; subsequently edited and published, by friend and collaborator Friedrich Engels as the work of Marx:
 Capital Volume II: The Process of Circulation of Capital from the Marxists Internet Archive.
  Capital, Volume II 1974 Progress Publishers edition, downloadable PDF from the Internet Archive.
 Capital, Volume III (1894); manuscript not completed by Marx before his death in 1883; subsequently edited and published, by friend and collaborator Friedrich Engels as the work of Marx:
 Capital Volume III: The Process of Capitalist Production as a Whole at the Marxists Internet Archive.
  Capital, Volume III 1974 Progress Publishers edition, downloadable PDF from the Internet Archive.
 Capital, Volume IV (1905–1910); critical history of theories of surplus value; manuscript written by Marx; partial edition edited and published after Marx's death by Karl Kautsky as Theories of Surplus Value; other editions published later:
 Capital, Volume IV: Theories of Surplus Value at Marxists Internet Archive.
 Part I Part II Part III, 1975 Progress Publishers editions, downloadable PDF from the Internet Archive.

 Synopses
"Reading Marx's Capital". Series of video lectures by professor David Harvey.
  Includes Engels' Synopsis of Capital.
 

1867 non-fiction books
1885 non-fiction books
1894 non-fiction books
Books critical of capitalism
Marxism
Political books
Unfinished books
Communist books
Books about capitalism
Books by Karl Marx
Books in political philosophy
Stage theories
1867 in economics
Books published posthumously
Historical materialism
Political textbooks
Critique of political economy
Books about socialism